Alexis Shotwell (b. 1974) is a Canadian philosopher, currently employed as Professor in the Department of Sociology and Anthropology at Carleton University in Ottawa, where she is cross-appointed with the Pauline Jewett Institute of Women's and Gender Studies and the Department of Philosophy. Educated at University of California, Santa Cruz (PhD), Dalhousie University (MA) and McGill University (BA), Shotwell has also taught at Laurentian University.

She works in social philosophy, political theory, and feminist philosophy, especially on questions of moral complicity. She is also the lead researcher for a project on the history of AIDS activism in Canada.

Publications
Her publications include:

Against Purity: Living Ethically in Compromised Times, published by University of Minnesota Press (2016)
Knowing Otherwise: Race, Gender, and Implicit Understanding, published by Pennsylvania State University Press (2011)

References

External links
 Alexis Shotwell website

1974 births
Living people
Academic staff of Carleton University
Canadian philosophers
Canadian women non-fiction writers
Canadian women philosophers
Feminist philosophers
McGill University alumni